The 1968 Segunda División de Chile was the 17th season of the Segunda División de Chile.

Antofagasta Portuario was the tournament's champion.

Table

Promotion playoffs

Relegation playoffs

See also
Chilean football league system

References

External links
 RSSSF 1968

Segunda División de Chile (1952–1995) seasons
Primera B
Chil